Denfert-Rochereau may refer to:

 Pierre Philippe Denfert-Rochereau, a soldier of the Franco-Prussian War.
 , a road in Paris commemorating him.
 Place Denfert-Rochereau, a square in Paris, also commemorating him.
 Denfert-Rochereau (Paris Métro), the Metro station.
 Gare de Denfert-Rochereau, the RER station.